The Scorpionidae (burrowing scorpions or pale-legged scorpions) make up the superfamily Scorpionoidea. The family was established by Pierre André Latreille, 1802.

Genera
Scorpionidae contains the following genera:

 Aops Volschenk & Prendini, 2008
 Chersonesometrus Couzijn, 1978
 Deccanometrus Prendini & Loria, 2020
 Gigantometrus Couzijn, 1978
 Heterometrus Ehrenberg, 1828
 Javanimetrus Couzijn, 1978
 Opistophthalmus C. L. Koch, 1837
 Pandiborellius Rossi, 2015
 Pandinoides Fet, 1997
 Pandinops Birula, 1913
 Pandinopsis Vachon, 1974
 Pandinurus Fet, 1997
 Pandinus Thorell, 1876
 Pandipalpus Rossi, 2015
 Sahyadrimetrus Prendini & Loria, 2020
 Scorpio Linnaeus, 1758
 Srilankametrus Couzijn, 1981
 Urodacus Peters, 1861

References

 
Scorpion families
Taxa named by Pierre André Latreille